William Michael Withycombe (born November 18, 1964 in Meridian, Mississippi) is a former professional American and Canadian football offensive lineman who played three seasons in the Canadian Football League, mainly for the Baltimore Stallions. Previously he played four seasons in the NFL for three different teams. He played college football at Fresno State University. He was a part of the Stallions' Grey Cup victory in 1995. He won the CFL's Most Outstanding Offensive Lineman Award in 1995.

On April 17, 2017, while in Las Vegas, Withycombe received media attention for stepping in to protect a female neighbor and her daughter from a man who was threatening to kill them. Withycombe, who had been sleeping in his home, was awakened by the sound of shouting. He put on the first garment at hand - a kilt - and headed outside to assess the situation. After Withycombe asked the intruder to leave, the man took a swing at him, so Withycombe tackled him and restrained him until police arrived on the scene. News reports indicate that Withycombe's unusual attire was a source of great amusement for the responding officers.

References

1964 births
Living people
American football offensive linemen
American players of Canadian football
Baltimore Stallions players
BC Lions players
Canadian football offensive linemen
Cincinnati Bengals players
Fresno State Bulldogs football players
Montreal Alouettes players
New York Jets players
Sportspeople from Meridian, Mississippi
Pittsburgh Steelers players
Players of American football from Mississippi
People from Lemoore, California
Players of American football from California